A backward stochastic differential equation (BSDE) is a stochastic differential equation with a terminal condition in which the solution is required  to be adapted with respect to an underlying filtration. BSDEs naturally arise in various applications such as stochastic control, mathematical finance, and nonlinear Feynman-Kac formulae.

Background
Backward stochastic differential equations were introduced by Bismut in 1973 in the linear case and by Pardoux and Peng in 1990 in the nonlinear case.

Mathematical framework

Fix a terminal time  and a probability space . Let  be a Brownian motion with natural filtration . A backward stochastic differential equation is an integral equation of the type

Example

In the case , the BSDE reduces to

If , then it follows from the martingale representation theorem, that there exists a unique stochastic process  such that  and  satisfy the BSDE.

See also
 Martingale representation theorem
 Stochastic control
 Stochastic differential equation

References

Further reading
 
 

Stochastic differential equations